AB Aviation is a private regional airline and the largest in the Comoros headquartered and based at Prince Said Ibrahim International Airport.

History 
On 19 March 2022, the Comorian Civil Aviation revoked the air operator's certificate of AB Aviation, halting all operations.

Destinations 

As of August 2018, AB Aviation served the following destinations:
Comoros
 Anjouan - Ouani Airport
 Moheli - Mohéli Bandar Es Eslam Airport
 Moroni - Prince Said Ibrahim International Airport
France (Mayotte)
 Dzaoudzi - Dzaoudzi–Pamandzi International Airport
Tanzania
 Dar es Salaam - Julius Nyerere International Airport

Fleet
As of June 2019, the airline's fleet included the following aircraft:

 1 Embraer ERJ 145
 3 Embraer EMB 120

Accidents and incidents 
 On February 26, 2022, a Cessna 208 Caravan operating flight 1103 crashed about 2.5 km from Mohéli Airport into the sea. All 14 occupants on board were killed.

See also 
 List of defunct airlines of the Comoros

References

External links
Official website

Defunct airlines of the Comoros
Airlines established in 2010
Airlines disestablished in 2022
Moroni, Comoros
2013 establishments in the Comoros
2022 disestablishments in the Comoros